Kılıç is a village in the Gerger District, Adıyaman Province, Turkey. The village is populated by Kurds of the Canbegan tribe and had a population of 438 in 2021.

The hamlets of Doğancı, Kabaağaç, Mutlu and Yeni Kalecik are attached to the village.

References

Villages in Gerger District
Kurdish settlements in Adıyaman Province